Garric Simonsen (b: 1975) is a visual artist and musician living in Spokane, WA. Simonsen's artwork is autobiographically informed. Simonsen received his Bachelor of Arts from The Evergreen State College in June, 2005, and his Masters in Fine Arts from Washington State University in June, 2010.

Career 
Curated by Vito Schnabel, Simonsen was included in the 2010 Brucennial, a large group show in lower Manhattan under the arts collective, The Bruce High Quality Foundation. Considered to be "the most important survey of contemporary art in the world ever, " the exhibition brought together 420 artists from 911 countries working in 666 discrete disciplines.A critical review of the exhibition appeared in a New York Times article by Holland Cotter. Among younger contemporaries, the exhibition included such names as; David Salle, Francesco Clemente, Ron Gorchov, George Condo, Donald Baechler, James Nares and Julian Schnabel. Shortly following, Simonsen's work was chosen for an exhibition at Platform Gallery in Seattle, WA, curated by artist William Powhida. A quote by the show organizers stated, "Through the use of associative thinking, non-scientific causal reasoning, symbolic expression, metaphor, metonym, and synchronicity the goal of artist and magician are the same seeking to affect change in the world. With this show we seek a synchronicity that will dissolve distinctions and help us to shed light on the dark and dark on the light. By looking at the production of art through much older means, we may discover new ways of experiencing and understanding its role." In 2014 Simonsen exhibited drawings for the Bellevue Arts Museum: BAM Biennial: Knock on Wood. These works responded to a large collection of his family's turn-of-the-century photographs of the Pacific Northwest's logging and railroad industries. A critical response to Simonsen's drawings were featured in the Seattle Weekly blog for a review of the Biennial by arts writer Brian Miller.

References

External links
Garric Simonsen's official website

American contemporary artists
1975 births
Living people
Musicians from Spokane, Washington
Artists from Spokane, Washington
Evergreen State College alumni